The Pequawket (also Pigwacket and many other spelling variants, from Eastern Abenaki apíkwahki, "land of hollows") are a Native American subdivision of the Abenaki people who formerly lived near the headwaters of the Saco River in Carroll County, New Hampshire and Oxford County, Maine. Pequawket is also the Abenaki name for Fryeburg, Maine, and the Abenaki name for Kearsarge North mountain.

Molly Ockett was a Pequawket woman known for her skills in medical healing in the early 19th century.

See also
 Battle of Pequawket
 Pequawket Brook
 Nescambious - a well-known Pequawket chief in the 18th century.

References

Abenaki
Algonquian peoples
Native American history of Maine
Native American history of New Hampshire
Algonquian ethnonyms
Native American tribes in Maine